Eristalinus punctulatus is a species of hover fly within the genus Eristalinus, which is in the family Syrphidae.

Description
The species has spotted eyes, with the males being holoptic and the females dichoptic. Adults are active during almost the whole year with a significant peak in summer between November and January.

Range
The species is found across Australia, and has also been reported in New Caledonia and the Solomon Islands

References

Insects described in 1847
Eristalinae
Insects of Australia
Insects of New Caledonia
Insects of the Solomon Islands